Labeobarbus roylii is a species of cyprinid fish found in the Chiloango and the Kouilou river basins in Angola and the Republic of Congo.

References 

Cyprinid fish of Africa
Taxa named by George Albert Boulenger
Fish described in 1912